Michael John William Chappell BEM (14 September 1934 – 10
August 2020), better known as Mike Chappell, was an English military historian and illustrator of military books.

Early life and education
Chappell came from an Aldershot family with links to the British Army going back several generations. His maternal grandfather, Pte George Green was among a group of soldiers of the Royal Welch Fusiliers killed in France on 14 September 1915 while laying a signal line to an outpost; he is buried in the Guards Cemetery at Windy Corner near Cuinchy. Mike Chappell's late parents were Samuel Chappell (a Warrant Officer in the Royal Army Service Corps) and Kathleen (née Green). His siblings are Anthony Chappell (born 1936), who served in the Royal Corps of Signals; Anna Chappell (born 1940), and Russell Chappell (born 1944).

As a boy, he attended St. Joseph's Roman Catholic School in Aldershot, the Army School at Blackdown in Hampshire and Guildford Technical College.

Career

Military career
After leaving school, Chappell briefly served an industrial blacksmith apprenticeship with 13 Command Workshop REME. However, finding this not to his liking, in 1952, at age 17, he enlisted as a private in the Royal Hampshire Regiment, a British Army line-infantry regiment, and in 1955, transferred to the Gloucestershire Regiment, another British Army infantry regiment.   During his 22-year military career he saw service in Cyprus, Germany, Libya, Malaya, Swaziland, Ulster and various British garrisons.

He retired in 1974 as a Regimental Sergeant Major of the 1st Battalion (Rifle Volunteers) of the Wessex Regiment, a British Army Territorial Army infantry regiment.

Writing and illustrating career

He first began painting military subjects for his own interest in 1968, turning professional when he left the army. His many years of military service actually wearing the kit and using the weapons give him a unique insight in his illustrations. Consequently, Chappell has gained worldwide popularity as a military illustrator, having written and illustrated over 100 books, many for Osprey Publishing.

A number of his original artworks are held in the Glenn Christodoulou Collection.

Personal life
Formerly a resident of Aldershot, Chappell lived in the village of Malras in France with his second wife, Marilyn until his death in August 2020. His marriage to his first wife, Edna, was dissolved. He was awarded the British Empire Medal in the Queen's Birthday Honours List on 15 June 2013.

Osprey books written and/or illustrated by Chappell
 Japanese Paratroop Forces of World War II
 The British Army in World War I (1) The Western Front 1914–16
 The British Army in World War I (2) The Western Front 1916–18
 The British Army in World War I (3) The Eastern Fronts
 British Tommy 1914–18
 The Guards Divisions 1914–45
 World War II Infantry Tactics Squad and Platoon
 Wellington's Peninsula Regiments (2) The Light Infantry
 Wellington's Peninsula Regiments (1) The Irish
 Luftwaffe Air & Ground Crew 1939–45
 The British Army 1939–45 (1) North-West Europe
 The British Army 1939–45 (2) Middle East & Mediterranean
 The British Army 1939–45 (3) The Far East
 British Cavalry Equipments 1800–1941
 Axis Cavalry in World War II
 The Indian Army 1914–1947
 The US Army in World War II (1) The Pacific
 The US Army in World War II (2) The Mediterranean
 The US Army in World War II (3) Northwest Europe
 US Paratrooper 1941–45
 The King's German Legion (1) 1803–12
 The King's German Legion (2) 1812–16
 British Infantry Equipments (1) 1808–1908
 British Infantry Equipments (2) 1908–2000
 French Foreign Legion 1914–45
 French Foreign Legion Infantry and Cavalry since 1945  
 The French Indochina War 1946–54
 The French Army 1939–45 (1)
 The French Army 1939–45 (2)
 The Algerian War 1954–62
 Redcaps: Britain's Military Police
 Junkers Ju 87 Stukageschwader 1937–41
 Panzerkampfwagen III Medium Tank 1936–44
 Army Commandos 1940–45 
 Focke-Wulf Fw 190 Aces of the Russian Front 
 US Marine Corps 1941–45 
 Scottish Divisions in the World Wars
 International Brigades in Spain 1936–39
 The Gurkhas 
 18th-Century Highlanders
 Churchill Infantry Tank 1941–51
 Security Forces in Northern Ireland 1969–92
 British Battledress 1937–61
 Napoleon's Italian Troops
 British Territorial Units 1914–18
 The War in Cambodia 1970–75
 The British Army in the 1980s
 British Battle Insignia (1) 1914–18
 British Battle Insignia (2) 1939–45
 Modern African Wars (1) Rhodesia 1965–80
 The Korean War 1950–53
 The Canadian Army at War
 Armies of the Vietnam War 1962–75
 Armies of the Vietnam War (2)
 Partisan Warfare 1941–45
 German Airborne Troops 1939–45
 British Cavalry Equipments 1800–1941 
 Germany's Eastern Front Allies 1941–45
 Battle for the Falklands (1) Land Forces
 The Israeli Army in the Middle East Wars 1948–73 
 Arab Armies of the Middle East Wars 1948–73
 The Malayan Campaign 1948–60
 The Australian Army at War 1899–1975 
 British Guards Armoured Division 1941–45
 Allied Tank Destroyers 
 The Lee / Grant Tanks in British Service
 The Australian Army in World War I

Other books by Chappell
The Somme 1916 Crucible of a British Army Windrow & Greene (1995) 
The British Soldier in the 20th Century 2: Field Service Head Dress 1902 to the present day  Wessex Military Publishing (1987)

See also

 List of English writers
 List of historians
 List of illustrators

References

External links
 
 Uniforms of the Confederate States by Chappell
 Mike Chappell books published by Osprey
 Mike Chappell books on Alibris

1934 births
2020 deaths
Writers from Aldershot
20th-century British artists
20th-century English historians
21st-century British artists
21st-century English historians
English illustrators
English military historians
Gloucestershire Regiment soldiers
Historians of the Korean War
Royal Hampshire Regiment soldiers
Historians of the Vietnam War
British war artists
Historians of World War I
Historians of World War II
20th-century British Army personnel
Artists from Aldershot
Military personnel from Aldershot